Otherness may refer to:

 The state of the Other, in philosophy
 Alterity or otherness, the philosophical principle of exchanging one's perspective for that of the "other"
 Otherness of childhood
 Otherness (book), an anthology of science fiction stories by David Brin
 Otherness (F. Paul Wilson), a malevolent force in several novels by F. Paul Wilson
 Otherness (EP), a 1995 EP by Scottish band Cocteau Twins
 Otherness (Kindness album), a 2014 album by English musician Kindness
 Otherness (Alexisonfire album), a 2022 album by Canadian band Alexisonfire